Carphontes is a genus of beetle in the family Cerambycidae, containing the following species:

 Carphontes paradoxus Monne & Monne, 2010
 Carphontes posticalis Bates, 1881

References

Acanthocinini